Malda Lok Sabha constituency was one of the 543 parliamentary constituencies in India. The constituency centred on Malda in West Bengal, which was abolished following the delimitation of the parliamentary constituencies in 2008.

Assembly segments
Malda Lok Sabha constituency was composed of the following assembly segments:
  Habibpur (ST) (assembly constituency no. 39)
  Araidanga (assembly constituency no. 44)
  Malda (SC) (assembly constituency no. 45)
  Englishbazar (assembly constituency no. 46)
  Manikchak (assembly constituency no. 47)
  Suzapur (assembly constituency no. 48)
  Kaliachak (assembly constituency no. 49)

As per order of the Delimitation Commission in respect of the delimitation of constituencies in the West Bengal, Malda parliamentary constituency will cease to exist and current constituent assembly segments will be part of either of the two new ones: Maldaha Uttar Lok Sabha constituency or Maldaha Dakshin Lok Sabha constituency.

Members of Parliament

For MPs from the area in subsequent years see Maldaha Uttar Lok Sabha constituency and Maldaha Dakshin Lok Sabha constituency

Election results

By-election 2006
A by-election was held in this constituency on 13 September 2006 which was necessitated by the death of sitting MP A B A Ghani Khan Choudhury. In the by-election, Abu Hasem Khan Choudhury of  Congress defeated his nearest rival Sailen Sarkar of CPI(M) by 84,391 votes.

General election 2004

General elections 1951-2004
Most of the contests were multi-cornered. However, only winners and runners-up are mentioned below:

See also
Malda
List of Constituencies of the Lok Sabha

References

Former Lok Sabha constituencies of West Bengal
Politics of Malda district
Maldah
Former constituencies of the Lok Sabha
2008 disestablishments in India
Constituencies disestablished in 2008